Maaban is a remote populated place in Ghana.  Its coordinates are: Latitude (DMS): 6° 59′ 0″ N; Longitude (DMS): 2° 13′ 0″.  Tribesmen from Maaban were studied by Rosen in a seminal study proving that hearing loss is primarily associated with exposure to elevated sound levels, rather than a function of ageing.  Rosen's work also showed that high sound levels were responsible for a statistical elevation of blood pressure.

See also
Noise health effects

References

Geography of Ghana
Populated places in Ghana